Men Without Souls is a 1940 black and white crime movie, starring Barton MacLane and Glenn Ford and directed by Nick Grinde.

Plot 
Johnny Adams (Glenn Ford) goes to prison, under a false name, with the intention of killing the captain White (Cy Kendall), a bastard guard, who had beaten Johnny's father to death. Rev. Thomas Stoner (John Litel) newcomer, is the chaplain of the jail, the father is the mayor's opposition Schafer (Don Beddoe), Stoner finds out the intentions of Johnny and persuades him to follow his plan, but when "Blackie" Drew (Barton MacLane) kills White, Johnny is blamed

Cast

References 
Gunmen and gangsters: profiles of nine actors who portrayed memorable screen, by Michael Schlossheimer
The American movies reference book: the sound era, by Paul Michael, James Robert Parish, Prentice-Hall, inc

External links

1940 crime drama films
Columbia Pictures films
1940 films
American crime drama films
American black-and-white films
1940s English-language films
Films directed by Nick Grinde
1940s American films